1994 Bellmare Hiratsuka season

Review and events

League results summary

League results by round

Competitions

Domestic results

J.League

Suntory series

NICOS series

Emperor's Cup

J.League Cup

Player statistics

 † player(s) joined the team after the opening of this season.

Transfers

In:

Out: no data

Transfers during the season

In
Akihiro Yoshida (from Takamatsu Commercial High School)
Takeshi Shimizu (from Teikyo Daisan High School)

Out

Awards
J.League Rookie of the Year: Kazuaki Tasaka
J.League Best XI: Yoshihiro Natsuka, Betinho

References

Other pages
 J. League official site
 Shonan Bellmare official website

Bellmare Hiratsuka
Shonan Bellmare seasons